The first Keating ministry (Labor) was the 58th ministry of the Government of Australia. It was led by the country's 24th Prime Minister, Paul Keating. The first Keating ministry succeeded the fourth Hawke ministry, which dissolved on 20 December 1991 following the successful leadership challenge by Keating and subsequent resignation of Bob Hawke as Prime Minister. The ministry was replaced by the second Keating ministry on 24 March 1993 following the 1993 federal election.

Cabinet

Outer ministry

Parliamentary Secretaries

See also 
 Second Keating ministry

Notes

Ministries of Elizabeth II
Keating, 1
Australian Labor Party ministries
1991 establishments in Australia
1993 disestablishments in Australia
Cabinets established in 1991
Cabinets disestablished in 1993